The Euro Players Tour Championship 2010/2011 – Event 2 (also known as the 2010 Brugge Open) was a professional minor-ranking snooker tournament that took place between 30 September–3 October 2010 at the Boudewijn Seapark in Bruges, Belgium.

Shaun Murphy won in the final 4–2 against Matthew Couch.

Prize fund and ranking points
The breakdown of prize money and ranking points of the event is shown below:

1 Only professional players can earn ranking points.
2 Prize money earned from the Plate competition does not qualify for inclusion in the Order of Merit.

Main draw

Preliminary rounds

Round 1
Best of 7 frames

Round 2
Best of 7 frames

Main rounds

Top half

Section 1

Section 2

Section 3

Section 4

Bottom half

Section 5

Section 6

Section 7

Section 8

Finals

Final

Century breaks

140  Jamie Cope
137, 113, 106, 104  Shaun Murphy
137, 104  Ding Junhui
136  Gerard Greene
136  Anthony McGill
135  Tony Drago
133, 118  Daniel Wells
132, 126  Fergal O'Brien
131, 118  Martin Gould
131  Luca Brecel
130  Rod Lawler
129, 101  Jimmy Robertson
126, 124, 102, 100  Mark Selby
125  Andrew Norman
122, 118  Peter Ebdon
122  Dave Harold
122  Craig Steadman

120  Nick Jennings
118  Judd Trump
115, 100  Peter Bullen
114, 104  Mark Williams
112  Andy Hicks
112  Rory McLeod
109, 100  Mark Joyce
108  Michael Holt
108  Jamie Jones
106, 102  Marco Fu
103  Nigel Bond
103  Liu Chuang
102  Barry Pinches
101, 101  Mark King
100  Igor Figueiredo
100  Jack Lisowski
100  Jimmy White

References

2 Euro
2010 in Belgian sport

sv:Euro Players Tour Championship 2010/2011#Euro Players Tour Championship 2